Django Bates (born Leon Bates, 2 October 1960) is a British jazz musician, composer, multi-instrumentalist, band leader and educator. He plays the piano, keyboards and the tenor horn. Bates has been described as "one of the most talented musicians Britain has produced... his work covers the entire spectrum of jazz, from early jazz through to bebop and free jazz to jazz-rock fusion." 

In additional to his jazz work, he is also a noted classical composer (writing both large- and small-scale compositions on commission), theatre composer, and has taught as a professor at various European music schools. As a leader, his bands have included Human Chain, Delightful Precipice, Quiet Nights, Powder Room Collapse Orchestra and Belovèd, and he was also a leading figure in Loose Tubes and Bill Bruford's Earthworks.

Early life
Bates was born in Beckenham, Kent, England, and attended Sedgehill School. While at this school, he also attended the Centre for Young Musicians in London (1971–77), where he learned trumpet, piano, and violin. In 1977–78 he studied at Morley College. In 1978, he enrolled at the Royal College of Music to study composition but left after two weeks.

As jazz musician
Bates founded Human Chain in 1979 and, in the 1980s, he rose to prominence in a jazz orchestra called Loose Tubes. In 1991, he started the 19-piece jazz orchestra Delightful Precipice. He also assembled the Powder Room Collapse Orchestra (which recorded Music for The Third Policeman) and created Circus Umbilicus, a musical circus show. Bates has appeared as a sideman or member of Dudu Pukwana's Zila, Tim Whitehead's Borderline, Ken Stubbs's First House, Bill Bruford's Earthworks, Sidsel Endresen, and in the bands of George Russell and George Gruntz. He has performed with Michael Brecker, Tim Berne, Christian Jarvi, Vince Mendoza, David Sanborn, Kate Rusby, and Don Alias.

As composer

Bates has concentrated on writing large-scale compositions on commission. These include:
 "Dream Kitchen" for percussionist Evelyn Glennie
 "Fine Frenzy" for the Shobhana Jeyasingh Dance Company
 "What It's Like to be Alive", a piano concerto for Joanna MacGregor and the Royal Liverpool Philharmonic Orchestra
 "2000 Years Beyond UNDO", a concerto for electric keyboard which was performed at the millennium Barbican Festival

Bates worked closely with director Lucy Bailey on several theatre projects, including Gobbledegook for the Gogmagogs, Baby Doll, (Birmingham Rep, National Theatre, Albery Theatre), Stairs to the Roof (Chichester Festival Theatre), The Postman Always Rings Twice (West Yorkshire Playhouse, Albery Theatre) and Titus Andronicus (Shakespeare's Globe). They also worked on a short film You Can Run. Other theatre work includes Gregory Doran's production of As You Like It (RSC), and Campbell Graham's Out There!.

He was the inaugural artistic director of the music festival FuseLeeds in 2004. He used this opportunity to initiate the first orchestral commission for Jonny Greenwood of Radiohead. Django also commissioned sixty composers including Laurie Anderson, Gavin Bryars, Patrick Moore, and John Zorn, to write one bar each. He then quilted these bars into the piece "Premature Celebration", which was performed by Evan Parker and the London Sinfonietta to celebrate Parker's 60th birthday.

The Wire voted Bates Best UK Jazz Composer in 1987 and 1990. In 1997, he won the Jazzpar Prize. In 2008, he was nominated for the PRS New Music Award. He was awarded a fellowship by the Leeds College of Music in 1995.

Teaching
In 2002, he was a tutor at the Banff Centre jazz program alongside Jim Black and Dave Douglas. In July 2005 he was appointed Professor of Rhythmic Music at the Rhythmic Music Conservatory (RMC) in Copenhagen. He was appointed visiting professor of jazz at the Royal Academy of Music in London in September 2010. In September 2011 Django Bates was appointed Professor of Jazz at HKB Bern Switzerland.

Awards and honours
 The Jazzpar Prize, 1997
 The Ivor’s Jazz Award, 2019

Discography
An asterisk (*) indicates that the year is that of release.

As leader/co-leader

As sideman
With Loose Tubes
 Loose Tubes (1985)
 Delightful Precipice (1986)
 Open Letter (1988)
 Dancing on Frith Street (recorded live 1990) (2010)
 Säd Afrika (recorded live 1990) (2012)
With Billy Jenkins
 Greenwich (1985)
 Uncommerciality Vol 1 (1986)
 Scratches of Spain (1987)
With First House
 Eréndira (1985)
 Cantilena (1989)
With Bill Bruford's Earthworks
 Earthworks (1987)
 Dig? (1989)
 All Heaven Broke Loose (1991)
 Stamping Ground (1994)
 Heavenly Bodies (1997)
With Iain Ballamy
 Balloon Man (1989)
 All Men Amen (1995)
With Tim Berne's Caos Totale
Nice View (JMT, 1994) 
With Anouar Brahem
Blue Maqams (ECM, 2017)
With Sidsel Endresen 
 So I Write (1990)
 Exile (1993)
With Julian Argüelles
 Skull View (1997)
 Escapade (1999)

With others
 Dudu Pukwana – Life in Bracknell and Willisau (1983)
 Tim Whitehead's Borderline – English People (1983)
 Dudu Pukwana – Zila '86 (1986)
 Social Systems – Research (1987)
 The Dedication Orchestra – Spirits Rejoice (1992)
 Hank Roberts – Little Motor People (JMT, 1993)
 Christy Doran – Play the music of Jimi Hendrix (1994)
 Harry Beckett – Bates plays piano on song: 'Les Jardins du Casino' – Les Jardins du Casino (1995), Maxine (2010)
 Michael Gibbs — Big Music (ACT, 1996)
 Bendik Hofseth – Colours (1997)
 Søren Nørbo Trio – Debates (2005)
 Marius Neset – Golden XPlosion (2011)

References

Further reading
 "The Shape of Jazz Just Come", Review of You Live and Learn (Apparently), The Economist, 16 December 2004.
 "In Praise of Django Bates" Review of You Live and Learn (Apparently), Downbeat
 Django Bates, You Live and Learn (Apparently) The Guardian, 25 June 2004
 Review of Winter Truce (And Homes Blaze) All About Jazz

External links
 
 short film portrait on Django Bates and his work with ECM Records, shot in his home in Bern in 2020
  Django Bates and David Okumu interviewed by John Fordham, The Guardian, 4 February 2005
 Django Bates interviewed by Pascal Wyse , The Guardian, 2 December 2005
 "Preview: Django Bates on Tour with Soren Norbo Trio" 
 JazzPar Prize 1997 
 Django Bates's nomination for the PRS New Music Award
 Django Bates on Spotify playlist

1960 births
Living people
English jazz pianists
English jazz composers
Male jazz composers
English male composers
English multi-instrumentalists
English jazz horn players
Crossover (music)
Postmodern composers
Honorary Members of the Royal Academy of Music
People from Beckenham
Musicians from Kent
20th-century English musicians
British male pianists
21st-century pianists
20th-century British male musicians
20th-century British musicians
21st-century British male musicians
Loose Tubes members
Earthworks (band) members
Delightful Precipice members
Human Chain members
The Dedication Orchestra members
Voice of God Collective members